Matteo Olivero (born 29 July 2000) is an Italian footballer who last played for Nitra as a winger.

Club career

FC Nitra
Olivero made his Fortuna Liga debut for Nitra at pod Zoborom against Dunajská Streda on 21 November 2020. While featured in the starting-XI, he was replaced by Bonilha after a less than an hour of play, some 8 minutes after Marko Divković's decisive goal. Nitra lost the fixture 0:1.

Personal life
Olivero graduated from sport's gymnasium in Nitra and, per his communication, identifies as a Christian. In November 2021 it was revealed, that he invested in Bitcoin in 2016.

References

External links
 Futbalnet profile 
 
 

2000 births
Living people
Place of birth missing (living people)
Italian footballers
Italian expatriate footballers
Italian Christians
Association football midfielders
Pafos FC players
FC Nitra players
Slovak Super Liga players
Expatriate footballers in Cyprus
Italian expatriate sportspeople in Cyprus
Expatriate footballers in Slovakia
Italian expatriate sportspeople in Slovakia